The Jerry River is a river of the southwestern South Island of  New Zealand. It flows northwest into the Gorge River, which flows into the Tasman Sea between Jackson Bay and Big Bay.

See also
List of rivers of New Zealand

References
 
 

Rivers of the West Coast, New Zealand
Westland District
Rivers of New Zealand